The Opel Vectra is a mid-size car (large family car) that was engineered and produced by the German automaker Opel from 1988 until 2010. Available in saloon, hatchback and estate body styles, the Vectra was also sold by the Vauxhall marque in the United Kingdom as the Vauxhall Cavalier from 1988 to 1995 and then as the Vauxhall Vectra from 1995 to 2008, and it was also sold by Holden in Australia as the Holden Vectra, by Chevrolet in Latin America as the Chevrolet Vectra.

The Vectra was introduced in October 1988 as a replacement for the Opel Ascona, and was itself replaced in November 2008 by the new Opel Insignia, the nameplate spanning three generations and almost twenty one years.

Vectra A (1988–1995) 

The first generation Vectra, known as the Vectra A, was introduced in October 1988 for the 1989 model year, as a four-door notchback saloon, replacing the Opel Ascona C. A five-door hatchback version arrived in March 1989, and a coupé based on the Vectra, called the Calibra, was introduced in the end of that year. Both cars were designed by the Opel design chief at the time, Wayne Cherry.

Vauxhall Motors, the British GM subsidiary that shared most of its models with Opel, did not use the "Vectra" model name until the introduction of the second generation into the United Kingdom in October 1995 to replace the Cavalier. However, left hand drive Opel Vectras were produced at Vauxhall's Luton plant for export to other European countries.

The 1989 Vectra came in Base, LS, GL, GLS, CD, and GT models, its sister model was the third-generation Cavalier. Engines ranged initially from a 75 PS (55 kW) 1.4 L to a 130 PS (96 kW) 2.0 L Family II. The top-of-the-line Vectra 2000 16V arrived in September 1989. Its sixteen valve version of the 2.0 L engine produces 150 PS (110 kW) and was only available with the sedan bodywork, with available four wheel drive.

The sixteen valve engine also appeared in GT (GSI in some markets) models after the facelift, now mainly as a hatchback. Two four-wheel drive versions were added to the lineup in January 1989, and in September 1992, the car received a limited edition turbocharged version, with 204 PS (150 kW). In , the European Turbo 4x4 version of the Vectra was used in Formula One as its Safety Car.

Most notably, it was deployed at the San Marino Grand Prix.

The 1.4 litre engine was not available in all markets, and even then, it was generally only available in basic trims (Base/L in United Kingdom, LS/GL in Europe). In markets as Italy, where smaller engines were favored by the taxation system, a 1.4 GLS was also offered. With the introduction of Euro I emissions regulations, the 1.4 was replaced by a 1.6 L with the same output for most markets.

A 2.5 L V6 engine appeared towards the later stages of the Vectra's life, developing 170 PS (125 kW), turning the car into a relaxed motorway cruiser rather than giving it sporty pretensions.

The front suspension was fully independent, with MacPherson struts, pressed steel lower control arms, and an anti-roll bar. The front suspension, together with the major mechanicals (engine and transmission) is remotely mounted on a front subframe. On front wheel drive models, the rear suspension is semi independent, consisting of a torsion beam linked to trailing arms, with double conical coil springs and direct acting telescopic hydraulic shock absorbers, with certain models also having an anti roll bar.

On the four wheel drive GSi, 4x4 and Turbo models, the rear suspension is a subframe mounted fully independent design, with semi trailing arms, double conical coil springs, direct acting gas assisted telescopic shock absorbers, and an anti roll bar. Steering gear is a rack and pinion-type (manual or power assisted, depending on model), mounted on the bulkhead (firewall), with a telescopically deformable steering column.

The Vectra also received a refresh in September 1992. The range received new front grilles and a black plastic strip above the rear taillamps, along with an upgrade to the structure for improved crashworthiness. Airbags became available onwards from 1993.

In New Zealand, the Vectra A was offered initially as an Opel between 1989 and 1994, but it wore Holden badges between 1994 and 1996 until the introduction of the Vectra B. It was not sold in Australia, where Holden instead offered a rebadged Toyota Camry called Apollo until 1997. In Japan, the Vectra (and Omega) were the first Opels to be distributed by Isuzu Motors Ltd. rather than long standing importer Toho Motors (東邦モーターズ), beginning in July 1989.

In Egypt, the Opel Vectra A was not introduced until 1994 through GM Egypt dealerships, and started production in the end of 1994 by GM Egypt through the beginning of 1996, with a range of 1.6 GL, 2.0 GL trim and 2.0 GLS trim and only Saloon body style boosting strong sales during this short run. This was similar to the Opel Kadett.

Chevrolet Vectra (Brazil)
In Brazil, the Chevrolet badged Vectra A was not introduced until 1993, when it replaced the Chevrolet Monza, a restyled version of the Ascona C. The first Brazilian model had two engine options: 2.0 8 valve, for the GLS and CD versions and the 2.0 16 valve with 150 hp imported from Germany, the later only available for the GSI version.

The release of the second generation of the Chevrolet Vectra in Brazil happened at the same time that the IndyCar series in Brazil, GM made a deal to use the Vectra as a Medical and Safety car for the race. The second generation (or Vectra B), came with the already available 2.0 8-valve engine on the GL and GLS versions and a national version of the previously 2.0 16 valve for the CD version.

In 1998, GM introduced the new 2.2 8 valve engine for the GL and GLS, and the 2.2 16 valve with 138 hp and 207Nm for the CD version.

Engines

Vectra B (1995–2002) 

The second model, the Vectra B, was introduced in October 1995 for the 1996 model year, at the Frankfurt Motor Show, and the model range came to include an estate version for the first time. This model replaced the Vauxhall Cavalier in the United Kingdom. The five-door estate version premiered in September 1996, with the tagline ‘One step ahead of the Mob’.

The Vauxhall badged Vectra B was the last Vauxhall to be produced at the company's Luton plant, where the end of automobile production was announced in December 2000, taking effect just over a year later. Car production at the site finished in March 2002, although production of commercial vehicles continued.

The Vectra B was replaced by the Vectra C in September 2002, which was branded as the Holden Vectra in Australia and New Zealand. Between 1998 and 2001, Holden assembled the Vectra for export to other RHD markets in the region, with a view to exporting 60 per cent of output, although this was adversely affected by the Asian economic crisis.

Engines started from the 75 PS (55 kW) 1.6 L, Family 1 but eventually the 8-valve engines were all replaced by 16-valve powerplants. The 2.0 L Family II engine, with 136 PS (100 kW) was developed as a basis for touring car racing (later in Australia, 2.2 L 108 kW), but the top of the line was a 2.5 L V6 with 170 PS (125 kW).

Diesel power came once again from Isuzu, with 1.7 liters and 82 PS, also a 2.0 L Ecotec with either 82 PS or 101 PS and 2.2 L Ecotec with 125 PS. In 2001, the all new 2.2 L petrol engine, as carried over to the Vectra C, was introduced with the 2.5 L petrol in its last incarnation being upgraded to a 2.6 L to accommodate emissions improvements. In April 1999, the Vectra was updated, receiving a mildly modified body (that can be identified by the single piece headlight units and body coloured bumpers) together with somewhat improved handling and better equipment.

Sporting limited edition models included the touring car championship inspired i500, Super Touring and GSi. The first model was developed in Germany by Opel Motorsport, with the V6 engine's power increased to 195 PS (143 kW), and the other two were created in Milton Keynes by Motor Sport Developments.

Only 3,900 2.5 GSi models were ever produced, mostly in saloon and hatchback guise. With only 317 estate versions produced during this time, they became one of the rarest production Vauxhalls ever.

On model years 2001 and 2002, a last of the line 2.6 GSi was made also but these were limited to five hundred cars. These were again mostly saloons and hatchbacks, however 37 estates were made. These models received a host of extra upgrades, including to Xenon headlamps, and larger front brakes.

In October 2013, Top Gear magazine placed the 1995 Vectra on its list of The 13 Worst Cars Of The Last 20 Years, describing the car as "so mediocre that Jeremy Clarkson refused to drive it."

Production of the Vectra B ended in March 2002.

Production elsewhere
Egypt
In Egypt, the production of the Opel Vectra B continued during 1996 with two models, initially a 1.6l 8v GLS trim with manual transmission, and a 2.0l 8v CD trim with automatic transmission.

Later in 2000, the revised model was produced with three models 1.6 8v GLS trim with manual transmission (later replaced by the 1.6 16v GLS trim with automatic transmission), 2.0 16v CD trim with automatic transmission, and a 2.0 CDX trim automatic transmission and all with saloon body style. In 2002, local production of the Opel Vectra ceased, in favour of the Opel Corsa Saloon and Opel Astra Saloon.

North America
A related model sold in North America was the Saturn L-Series, introduced in 2000, but dropped from the line up in 2005. It was replaced by the 2007 Saturn Aura, which was built around GM's Epsilon architecture, shared with the Vectra C.

Rebadged variants

Vectra C (2002–2010) 

Built on the new GM Epsilon platform, the Opel Vectra C, released in March 2002 for the 2003 model year was initially available as a four-door notchback saloon and a five-door hatchback, known as the GTS. A five-door estate was added in October 2003. The Vectra C's official debut was at the 2002 Geneva Motor Show.

Originally, the Vectra C was due to début with the Saab 9-3 in October 2001, at the Frankfurt Motor Show, but in July 2001, it was announced that delays had forced General Motors to postpone the introduction. The hatchback version premiered in September 2002. The four door notchback saloon version of the Vectra C almost resembled a two-box four door fastback saloon.

The Vectra C was first seen in November 1999, in a copy of Auto Express. At the Frankfurt Motor Show in October 2003, the estate version premièred, which had a slightly longer wheelbase than the hatchback and saloon versions. Sharing the  wheelbase of the estate, an "executive hatchback" sold under the Opel/Vauxhall Signum nameplate. The Signum, which was based partly on the Vectra C, featured a completely different layout in the rear.

From June to July 2002, Ed Harris starred in adverts for the Vauxhall Vectra in the United Kingdom. Pierluigi Collina also starred in adverts across Europe for the Vectra, as well as the Signum, in the end of 2005.

Being a main engine for another GM brand, Saab, it was only ever sold in small numbers in the Vectra.

Diesel power, which had become important for commercial success in Europe, was provided by CDTI 1.9, 2.0 and 2.2 engines, with a top of the range Isuzu sourced 3.0 litre DMAX V6 outputting .

Handling was reported to be much better than the previous Vectra.

The Vectra C received a facelift in September 2005, with the début at the Frankfurt Motor Show, and it retained a similar line of engines. This Saab co-developed motor could produce . Opel installed the twin scroll turbo engine in its Signum productline with  output.

The  version was available for the Vectra later in 2006. Opel also introduced – for the first time – an OPC version of the Vectra, using the VXR name in the United Kingdom. These high performance variants were only available as hatchbacks and estates.

In Australia and New Zealand, the Holden Vectra ZC series was only available as a saloon and hatchback, Holden did not offer the Vectra C estate due to the presence of the Astra and later Holden Viva (Daewoo Lacetti) estates. The Vectra was dropped and replaced by the Holden Epica, a badge engineered Daewoo Tosca early in 2007.

Due to stockpiling of Vectras from 2005 for the market in Australasia, there was enough supply of the car for deliveries to last through to 2007. As a result, facelifted Vectra Cs were not sold in those markets. In 2008, the Vectra OPC was available with either six speed manual or six speed automatic transmission (Previous Vectra OPC had manual gearbox only). The 2.8L DOHC V6 turbo engine could generate .

Sales of the Vectra C in the United Kingdom were not as strong as those of its predecessors. For much of its production life, the original Vectra was the fourth best selling car in the country, but the Vectra C never came higher than tenth in the country's car sales charts, though within its own market sector it held on to second place, behind the Ford Mondeo.

In 2007, it finally made the Top 10 of Britain's car sales charts, being the nation's tenth most popular new car with over 50,000 sales, outselling the Ford Mondeo for the first time since 1999. Also, in January 2007, the estate variant was awarded Estate Car of the Year 2007, by What Car? magazine.

While the Vectra C was sold in Mexico and Chile as the Chevrolet Vectra, it was not marketed in Brazil, where Chevrolet opted to sell the Astra H under the Vectra brand from 2006 to 2011. Both local spec cars were powered by the FlexPower SOHC engine originally introduced in 1982 in the Chevrolet Monza.

Production of the Vectra C and Signum ended in July 2008. In Ireland, it was produced until February 2010.

Rebadged variants

Chevrolet Vectra D (2009–2012)

The Chevrolet Vectra D is the rebadged Version Opel Insignia in the market of Chile. It is a very rare model of Chevrolet in Chile, with not many found.

Renaming
In June 2013, the Vectra was renamed the Opel Insignia with a facelift since, it was the last rebadged Opel model from Chevrolet. It was available with the same name in Argentina, which was discontinued at the same time because, in February 2017, Opel was sold to the PSA Group.

Motorsport 

The Vectra was used in several touring car racing series.

In the 1990s, and the beginning of the 2000s, the Vectra B Super Touring took part in the British Touring Car Championship, the Asia-Pacific Touring Car Championship, the German Super Tourenwagen Cup, the Australian Super Touring Championship, the Japanese Touring Car Championship, the Italian Superturismo Championship, the French Supertouring Championship and the Swedish Touring Car Championship.

Uwe Alzen was third in Super Tourenwagen Cup in 1997 and 1998, and second in 1999; John Henderson was runner up in the 2000 Australian Super Touring Championship; John Cleland was British Touring Car Champion in 1995 and finished third in 1992 and fourth in 1993 and 1994; Yvan Muller was sixth in the 1999 British Touring Car Championship and fourth in 2000; and Nicklas Karlsson was third in the 2002 Swedish Touring Car Championship.

A prototype Vectra C was built to the BTC Touring specifications in 2003 by Triple Eight Race Engineering, with the view to using it in the 2004 BTCC, but it was never raced, despite being shown publicly at the 2004 Birmingham Motor Show as the 'Vectra Diesel Concept'.

After being replaced by the Astra H in the British Touring Car Championship, the Vauxhall Vectra was introduced in 2007. Fabrizio Giovanardi was champion in 2007 and 2008. VX Racing competed in the season of 2009, with three Vectras, driven by Giovanardi, Matt Neal and Andrew Jordan.

The Vectra has been used as a silhouette racing car: in the Stock Car Brasil in 2000 to 2003 (it was the champion for four seasons) and 2009, in the Argentine Top Race V6 since 2005 (Guillermo Ortelli was 2005 champion), and in the Deutsche Tourenwagen Masters in 2004 and 2005, with little success.

In 1994, a Vectra B was the official Formula 1 safety car during the 1994 San Marino Grand Prix driven by Max Angelelli at the time and was in front of Ayrton Senna for 5 laps before he crashed into Tamburello on lap 7.

References

External links 

 www.vauxhall.co.uk – Vauxhall UK

Vectra
Front-wheel-drive vehicles
Euro NCAP large family cars
Cars of Turkey
Mid-size cars
Hot hatches
Sedans
Station wagons
Police vehicles
Cars introduced in 1988
1990s cars
2000s cars
Touring cars
Cars discontinued in 2010